Niels Kerstholt (born April 2, 1983 in Utrecht) is a retired dutch Short track speed skater.

Kerstholt qualified himself for the 2006 Winter Olympics by finishing among the first twelve in a virtual ranking over 1000 metres using the results of the Speed Skating World Cup meetings in Bormio and The Hague in November 2005. This way he met the requirements set by the Dutch Olympic Committee and was his ticket to Turin reserved. As the Dutch also had a starting entry left at the 1500 metres which was not taken by any other skater Kerstholt also participated at this distance during the Olympics.

At the distance where he qualified himself, the 1000 metres, he was eliminated in the series. However, at the 1500 metres he reached the semi finals and started in the B-final as a result. Here he became fifth out of six skaters, which meant he finished in 11th position in the end. A few weeks after the Olympics Kerstholt became Dutch National Champion for the first time in his career. A year later he would successfully defend his title. He also broke the Dutch National Record over 1500 metres held by Robbert-Kees Boer with more than two seconds from 2:16.881 to a new best time of 2:14.885.

External links
 
 Niels Kerstholt at ISU

1983 births
Living people
Dutch male short track speed skaters
Olympic short track speed skaters of the Netherlands
Short track speed skaters at the 2006 Winter Olympics
Short track speed skaters at the 2010 Winter Olympics
Short track speed skaters at the 2014 Winter Olympics
Sportspeople from Utrecht (city)
21st-century Dutch people